Bernard J. Gallagher (February 27, 1912 – August 3, 1995) was a politician from Washington. Gallagher was a Democratic member of Washington House of Representatives from 1941 to 1943 and from 1949 to 1961.

References

1995 deaths
1912 births
Democratic Party members of the Washington House of Representatives
20th-century American politicians
People from Prosser, Washington